Jacobus Kapteyn - Astronomer
 Parallactic instrument of Kapteyn - the instrument used by Kapteyn to analyze photographic plates
 Jacobus Kapteyn Telescope - telescope named after Jacobus Kapteyn
 Kapteyn's Star - star named after Jacobus Kapteyn
 Kapteyn b - planet around Kapteyn's Star
 Kapteyn c - planet around Kapteyn's Star
 Kapteyn (crater) - Lunar crater named after Jacobus Kapteyn
 Kapteyn Astronomical Institute - Dutch Astronomical Institute named after Jacobus Kapteyn
 Paul Joan George Kapteyn - Dutch Judge